The 2011–12 Long Beach State 49ers men's basketball team represented California State University, Long Beach during the 2011–12 NCAA Division I men's basketball season. The 49ers, led by fifth year head coach Dan Monson, played their home games at Walter Pyramid and are members of the Big West Conference.  They finished the season 25–9, 15–1 in Big West play to be crowned regular season champions. They were also champions of the Big West Basketball tournament to earn the conference's automatic bid into the 2012 NCAA tournament where they lost in the second round to New Mexico.  The 49ers were the only Los Angeles-area college basketball team to make the tournament that year.

James Ennis played his freshman season at Oxnard College, a junior college in Oxnard, California, and his sophomore season at Ventura College, a junior college in Ventura, California. In 2011, he signed with Long Beach State, where he became a two-year starter. As a junior, Ennis averaged 10 points and 4.1 rebounds per game and helped lead the 49ers to Big West Conference regular season and conference titles. Ennis was named honorable mention all-conference at the close of the season.

Roster

Schedule

|-
!colspan=9| Regular season

|-
!colspan=9| 2012 Big West Conference men's basketball tournament

|-
!colspan=9| 2012 NCAA tournament

References

Long Beach State Beach men's basketball seasons
Long Beach
Long Beach